Javier Mirón (born 13 December 1999) is a Spanish middle-distance runner from Alicante.

He won the 800m at the Gran Premio Diputacion IV Memorial Jose Antonio Cansino in Castellón-MGH in August 2020 in a time of 1:46.74. In September 2020 at the Spanish championship Mariano García won a close 800m in 1:47.55 from  Miron who ran 1:47.76.

On 9 June 2021 Miron ran 1:44.82 at a meeting in Marseilles. This time placed him as the world leader of the year, the third fastest under-23 of all time, and sixth on the all time Spanish list.

Personal best

Outdoor
800 metres: 1:44.82 (Marseilles 2021)
1500 metres: 3:44.93 (Madrid 2020)
Indoor
800 metres: 1:45.98 (Madrid 2023)
1500 metres: 3:43.75 (Valencia 2023)

Competition record

References

1999 births
Living people
Spanish male middle-distance runners
21st-century Spanish people